Incheon Housing and City Development Corporation is a handball club based in Incheon, South Korea. They compete in the Handball Korea League.

Honours 
Handball Korea League
Runners-up: 2017, 2020–21

South Korean Handball Festivals
Runners-up: 2008, 2009, 2010

References

External links
Official website 

Handball clubs established in 2006
South Korean handball clubs
Sport in Incheon
2006 establishments in South Korea